Lel is a populated place in the Province of Alicante, in the autonomous Valencian Community of Spain.  It is located northeast of the town of Pinoso and southwest of the municipality of Salinas.

References

Populated places in the Province of Alicante